Motion 103, also known as M-103, was a non-binding motion in the 42nd Canadian Parliament stating that the members of the House of Commons called on the Government of Canada to condemn Islamophobia in Canada. It also called on the Standing Committee on Canadian Heritage to carry out a study on how racism and religious discrimination can be reduced and collect data on hate crimes. The motion was introduced by Iqra Khalid, the Liberal MP representing Mississauga—Erin Mills.

The motion passed by a vote of 201–91 on March 23, 2017. The debate surrounding the motion was characterized as "deeply divisive", especially within the Official Opposition Conservative Party of Canada which was in the midst of a leadership election.

Background

Iqra Khalid, a Liberal Party member of parliament, presented Motion 103 in the House of Commons on December 5, 2016. Frank Baylis, another Liberal Party member of parliament, seconded the motion. The motion stemmed in part from e-petition E-411, which was exclusively about Islamophobia.

The motion initially did not receive much attention. Then on January 27, six Muslims were killed in Quebec city and the motion became a priority for the Liberal government. Motion 103 was debated on February 15, 2017. The same day, Mélanie Joly, the Minister of Canadian Heritage, stated that the Liberal Party caucus was to support Motion 103.

Some incorrectly refer to it as a "bill or a law, out of confusion or deliberate attempts to spread misinformation". M-103 is a private member's motion, which is a "proposal moved by an MP to draw attention to an issue considered urgent or of public interest", and is not equivalent to a law.

Motion's text
Motion 103 calls on the government to "condemn Islamophobia and all forms of systemic racism and religious discrimination", asks the government to "recognize the need to quell the increasing public climate of hate and fear", and request for the "Commons heritage committee to study how the government could develop a government-wide approach to reducing or eliminating systemic racism and religious discrimination, including Islamophobia, and collect data to provide context for hate crime reports and to conduct needs assessments for impacted communities. Findings are to be presented within eight months." Khalid has been "unwilling to entertain any compromise on the specific wording" of Motion 103.

The exact text reads:

Debate

Singling out Muslims
Motion 103 has been accused of "singling out Muslims for special treatment", by condemning only Islamophobia by name and not explicitly mentioning other religious groups. This argument was made by Pierre Lemieux, and Kellie Leitch.

Several previous motions in the House of Commons have singled out individual religions in a similar manner (for example, asking MPs to condemn anti-Semitism). Conservative MP Michael Chong pointed out that the House of Commons had previously passed motions that denounced hatred against Jews (on February 22, 2016), Yazidis (on October 25, 2016) and Coptic Christians (on October 17, 2011).

Freedom of speech
Others have accused M-103 of going against free speech and leading to "blasphemy laws". This was argued by Conservative MP Brad Trost and evangelical Christian activist Charles McVety.

Interim Conservative leader Rona Ambrose repudiated such claims and said: "To be clear, this is not a 'bill' nor a 'law'. It does not 'introduce Sharia law' as some people have suggested nor would it 'ban freedom of speech'." The Canadian Civil Liberties Association also said that M-103 does not restrict free speech in any way.

Hate crimes against Canadian Muslims

An argument in support of the motion is that it addresses a "pressing issue". Statistics Canada data indicated that hate crimes against Muslims more than doubled in the three-year period between 2013 and 2016. Canadians indicated the urgency of addressing this issue by signing a petition (with 70,000 signatures) condemning Islamophobia. Then in January 2017, 6 Muslims were killed in a mass shooting at a Quebec City mosque.

Iqra Khalid said that the death threats she has received, and the threats of violence that Canadian mosques have received, only serve to highlight how important it is for Parliament to condemn Islamophobia.

Use of term Islamophobia
Rona Ambrose and Lisa Raitt criticized the motion for its use of the term Islamophobia, which they described as "controversial". Many Conservative MPs said that the Liberals needed to define Islamophobia. On February 15, Iqra Khalid stated that the definition of Islamophobia is "the irrational hate of Muslims that leads to discrimination". Liberal Heritage Minister Melanie Joly similarly defined it as "discrimination against Muslim people and people that are of Muslim faith".

Protests
The M-103 debate provoked protests and counter-protests. On February 16, Rebel Media organized an anti-M103 rally at Canada Christian College. Demonstrations organized by the Canadian Coalition for Concerned Citizens against M-103 were held on March 4, 2017 in several cities across Canada. In Montreal, Quebec City, and Toronto demonstrations were attended by hundreds, while others in cities like Saskatoon, and London, Ontario were smaller. Stephen Garvey, leader of the newly formed nationalist National Advancement Party of Canada, organized protests against M-103 in Calgary. Many of these demonstrations included contingents from far-right groups including La Meute, Pegida, and the Soldiers of Odin.

Harassment of Khalid
Khalid received over 50,000 emails, many of them described as "vicious, cruel and hateful", some of which she read aloud during the debate on M-103.

Parliamentary history
M-103 passed 201-91 in March 2017, with support from the Liberals and NDP. Some MPs, including Trudeau, were not present for the vote. All of the Conservative Party leadership candidates sitting in the House of Commons, with the exception of Michael Chong, announced their opposition to Motion 103.

Prior to that, on February 16, 2017, David Anderson, a Conservative member of parliament, had tabled an alternative motion. The difference in the motions is that Anderson's motion doesn't contain the word "Islamophobia" and asks the House of Commons to "condemn all forms of systemic racism, religious intolerance, and discrimination of Muslims, Jews, Christians, Sikhs, Hindus, and other religious communities." Anderson's motion was defeated 165–126. The Conservative Party, Bloc Québécois, New Democratic Party, and Green Party voted for the motion and the Liberal Party voted against the motion.

In response to the M-103 debate, Ontario Liberal MPP Nathalie Des Rosiers introduced a similar motion in the Legislative Assembly of Ontario that called for the condemnation of Islamophobia. Des Rosiers' motion was supported by both the Progressive Conservative Party of Ontario and Ontario New Democratic Party, and was passed with a unanimous vote.

Report
In 2018, a House of Commons committee, recommended that January 29 (the day of the Quebec City mosque shooting) be recognized as a "national day of remembrance and action on religious discrimination, including Islamophobia." It also recommended developing policies and supporting more research on racism.

See also
Antisemitism in Canada
Islamophobia in Canada

References

External links
 Motion 103 full text and vote details at Parliament of Canada

2017 in Islam
Islamophobia in Canada
42nd Canadian Parliament
Motions (parliamentary procedure)
Justin Trudeau controversies
Religion and politics
2017 in Canadian politics